Konstantin Veniaminovich Astrakhantsev (born January 21, 1967, in Glazov, Russia) is a retired ice hockey player who played in the Soviet Hockey League.  He played for Traktor Chelyabinsk.  He was inducted into the Russian and Soviet Hockey Hall of Fame in 1993.

Career statistics

International statistics

External links

 Russian and Soviet Hockey Hall of Fame bio

1967 births
Living people
KalPa players
Russian ice hockey right wingers
Soviet ice hockey right wingers
Traktor Chelyabinsk players